Ruth Mazo Karras (born February 23, 1957) is an American historian and author of the Middle Ages whose interests are masculinity and sexuality in Christian and Jewish society during the Middle Ages. Her book, Unmarriages: Women, Men, and Sexual Unions in the Middle Ages, was named co-winner of the American Historical Association's Joan Kelly Memorial Prize in Women's History for 2012. 

Since 2018, Ruth Mazo Karras has held an appointment as the Lecky Professor of History at Trinity College Dublin. She was also the President of the Medieval Academy of America in 2019–20. In spring 2018, she was a visiting fellow at the St. Andrews Institute for Medieval Studies. 

Prior to taking up her post in Dublin, she served as Distinguished Teaching Professor of History at the University of Minnesota. She earned a PhD and an MPhil in History from Yale University, an MPhil in European Archaeology from the University of Oxford, and a BA in History from Yale.

Selected publications

[Edited volume with Elisheva Baumgarten and Katelyn Mesler], Entangled Histories: Knowledge, Authority, and Jewish Culture in the Thirteenth Century (Philadelphia: University of Pennsylvania Press, 2017).
Sexuality in Medieval Europe: Doing Unto Others 3rd edition (London: Routledge, 2017).
[Edited volume with Judith Bennett], Oxford Handbook of Women and Gender in Medieval Europe (Oxford: Oxford University Press, 2013).
Unmarriages: Women, Men, and Sexual Unions in the Middle Ages (Philadelphia: University of Pennsylvania Press, 2012).
“The Regulation of Sexuality in the Late Middle Ages: England and France,” Speculum: A Journal of Medieval Studies 86 (2011) 1010–1039.
[Tiffany Vann Sprecher and Ruth Mazo Karras,] “The Midwife and the Church: Ecclesiastical Regulation of Midwives in Brie, 1499-1504,” Bulletin of the History of Medicine 85 (2011), 171–192.
[Cameron Bradley and Ruth Mazo Karras,] “Masculine Sexuality and a Double Standard in Early Thirteenth-Century Flanders?” Leidschrift 25 (2010), 63–77.
[Ruth Mazo Karras and Jacqueline Murray,] “The Sexual Body,” in  A Cultural History of the Human Body, vol. 2, In the Medieval Age, ed. Linda Kalof (Oxford: Berg, 2010), 59–75.
“Marriage, Concubinage, and the Law,” in Law and the Illicit in Medieval Europe, ed. Ruth Mazo Karras, Joel Kaye, and E. Ann Matter (Philadelphia: University of Pennsylvania Press, 2008), 117–129.
[Edited volume with Joel Kaye and E. Ann Matter,] Law and the Illicit in Medieval Europe (Philadelphia: University of Pennsylvania Press, 2008).
From Boys to Men: Formations of Masculinity in Late Medieval Europe (Philadelphia: University of Pennsylvania Press, 2003).
Common Women: Prostitution and Sexuality in Medieval England (Oxford: Oxford University Press, 1996).
Slavery and Society in Medieval Scandinavia (New Haven: Yale University Press, 1988).

References 

University of Minnesota faculty
American women historians
1957 births
Living people
Fellows of the Medieval Academy of America
20th-century American historians
20th-century American women writers
21st-century American historians
21st-century American women writers
American medievalists
Women medievalists